The European Organisation for the Exploitation of Meteorological Satellites (EUMETSAT) is an intergovernmental organisation created through an international convention agreed by a current total of 30 European Member States.

EUMETSAT's primary objective is to establish, maintain and exploit European systems of operational meteorological satellites. EUMETSAT is responsible for the launch and operation of the satellites and for delivering satellite data to end-users as well as contributing to the operational monitoring of climate and the detection of global climate changes.

The activities of EUMETSAT contribute to a global meteorological satellite observing system coordinated with other space-faring states.

Satellite observations are an essential input to numerical weather prediction systems and also assist the human forecaster in the diagnosis of potentially hazardous weather developments. Of growing importance is the capacity of weather satellites to gather long-term measurements from space in support of climate change studies.

EUMETSAT is not an institution or agency of the European Union, although the majority of its members are EU member states. The organisation became a signatory to the International Charter on Space and Major Disasters in 2012, thus providing for the global charitable use of its space assets.

Member and cooperating states 
The national mandatory contributions of member states are proportional to their gross national income. However, the cooperating countries contribute only half of the fee they would pay for full membership. The convention establishing EUMETSAT was opened for signature in 1983 and entered into force on 19 June 1986.

Satellite programmes 

There are two types of programme:

Geostationary satellites, providing a continuous view of the earth disc from a stationary position in space.

And Polar-orbiting satellites, flying at a much lower altitude, sending back more precise details about atmospheric temperature and moisture profiles, although with less frequent global coverage.

High-level, stationary in space (Geostationary satellites) 

The current provision of geostationary satellite surveillance is enabled by the Meteosat series of satellites  operated by EUMETSAT, generating images of the full Earth disc and data for forecasting.

The first generation of Meteosat, launched in 1977, provided continuous, reliable observations to a large user group. In response to demand for more frequent and comprehensive data, Meteostat Second Generation (MSG) was developed with key improvements in swift recognition and prediction of thunderstorms, fog, and the small depressions which can lead to dangerous wind storms. MSG was launched in 2004. To capture foreseeable user needs up to 2025, a Meteostat Third Generation (MTG) is in active preparation.

Low-level orbiting (Polar satellites)

EUMETSAT Polar System 

The lack of observational coverage in certain parts of the globe, particularly the Pacific Ocean and continents of the southern hemisphere, has led to the increasingly important role for polar-orbiting satellite data in numerical weather prediction and climate monitoring.

EUMETSAT Polar System (EPS) Metop mission consists of three polar orbiting Metop satellites, to be flown successively for more than 14 years. The first, Metop-A, was launched by a Russian Soyuz-2.1a rocket from Baikonur on October 19, 2006, at 22:28 Baikonur time (16:28 UTC). Metop-A was initially controlled by ESOC for the LEOP phase immediately following launch, with control handed over to EUMETSAT 72 hours after lift-off. EUMETSAT's first commands to the satellite were sent at 14:04 UTC on October 22, 2006.

The second EPS satellite, Metop-B, was launched from Baikonur on 17 September 2012, and the third, Metop-C, was launched from Centre Spatial Guyanais in Kourou, French Guiana on 7 November 2018 by Arianespace using a Soyuz ST-B launch vehicle with a Fregat-M upper stage.

The satellites also ensure that the more remote regions of the globe, particularly in Northern Europe as well as the oceans in the Southern hemisphere, are fully covered.

The EPS programme is also the European half of a joint program with NOAA, called the International Joint Polar System. NOAA has operated a continuous series of low earth orbiting meteorological satellite since April 1960. Many of the instruments on Metop are also operated on NOAA/POES satellites, providing similar data types across the IJPS.

Instruments on Metop 
 A/DCS (Advanced Data Collection System)
 AMSU-A1 and AMSU-A2
 ASCAT Advanced Scatterometer
 AVHRR (Advanced Very High Resolution Radiometer)
 GOME-2 (Global Ozone Monitoring Experiment) — instrument to monitor ozone levels
 GRAS  (GNSS Receiver for Atmospheric Sounding: global navigation satellite systems radio occultation)
 HIRS  (High Resolution Infrared Sounder)
 IASI (Infrared atmospheric sounding interferometer)
 MHS (Microwave Humidity Sounder)
 SARP-3 and SARR (Search And Rescue Processor and Search And Rescue Repeater)
 SEM (Space Environment Monitor)

Jason 

Jason-2
The Jason-2 programme is an international partnership across multiple organisations, including EUMETSAT, CNES, and the US agencies NASA and NOAA.
Jason-2 was launched successfully from Vandenberg Air Force Base aboard a Delta-II rocket on 20 June 2008, 7:46 UTC. EUMETSAT – What We Do – Jason-2 – Launch Description

Jason-2 reliably delivers detailed oceanographic data vital to our understanding of weather forecasting and climate change monitoring. Jason-2 provides data on the decadal (10-yearly) oscillations in large ocean basins, such as the Atlantic Ocean; mesoscale variability, and surface wind and wave conditions. Jason-2 measurements contribute to the European Centre for Medium-Range Weather Forecasts (ECMWF) satellite data assimilation, helping improve global atmosphere and ocean forecasting.

Altimetric data from Jason-2 have also helped create detailed decade-long global observations and analyses of the El Niño and La Niña phenomena, opening the way to new discoveries about ocean circulation and its effects on climate, and providing new insights into ocean tides, turbulent ocean eddies and marine gravity.

Jason-3
Jason-3 was Launched on 17 January 2016, Vandenberg Air Force Base in California, on a SpaceX Falcon 9 launcher. It is operational since 14 October 2016.
Jason-3 is on a non-sun-synchronous low Earth orbit at 66° inclination and 1336 km altitude, optimised to eliminate tidal aliasing from sea surface height and mean sea level measurements. Jason-2, flies on the same orbit but at 162°.
It is built on the same cooperation as Jason-2, involving EUMETSAT, NOAA, CNES and NASA, with Copernicus expected to support the European contribution to operations, as part of its HPOA activity, which also covers contributions to the Jason-CS programme.

Sentinel-6/Jason-CS
The Sentinel-6 radar altimeter mission is part of the European Union's Copernicus Programme for Earth observation, with the objective of providing an operational service for high-precision measurements of global sea-level.

The mission, implemented through the two Sentinel-6/Jason-CS satellites (Sentinel-6 Michael Freilich and Sentinel-6B), aims to continue high precision ocean altimetry measurements in the 2020–2030 time-frame. A secondary objective is to collect high resolution vertical profiles of temperature, using the GNSS Radio-Occultation sounding technique, to assess temperature changes in the troposphere and stratosphere and to support Numerical Weather Prediction.

The launch of the first satellite – Sentinel-6 Michael Freilich – occurred successfully on 21 November 2020 from Vandenberg AFB in California, USA on a SpaceX Falcon-9 launch vehicle. The satellite was named in honour of Michael Freilich (oceanographer), an oceanographer and former director of NASA's Earth Science Division.

The launch of Sentinel-6B is foreseen for 2026.

See also 
EUMETNET
the European Centre for Medium-Range Weather Forecasts (ECMWF)
the French Centre National d'Etudes Spatiales (CNES)
the US National Oceanic and Atmospheric Administration (NOAA), the US equivalent of EUMETSAT
the US National Aeronautics and Space Administration (NASA), the US equivalent of the ESA

References

External links 

EUMETSAT weather satellite viewer Online EUMETSAT weather satellite viewer with 2 months of archived data.

 
European space programmes
Satellite meteorology
Meteorological organizations
Space organizations
Intergovernmental organizations established by treaty
1986 establishments in Europe
Scientific organizations established in 1986